Goose Creek is a stream in northeastern St. Francois and northern Ste Genevieve counties in the U.S. state of Missouri. It is a tributary of Fourche a Du Clos.

Genevieve County.

Goose Creek was so named on account of wild geese in the area.

See also
List of rivers of Missouri

References

Rivers of St. Francois County, Missouri
Rivers of Ste. Genevieve County, Missouri
Rivers of Missouri